Thomas's flying squirrel (Aeromys thomasi) is a species of rodent in the family Sciuridae. It is one of two species in the genus Aeromys. It is found in Indonesia and Malaysia.

References

Thorington, R. W. Jr. and R. S. Hoffman. 2005. Family Sciuridae. pp. 754–818 in Mammal Species of the World a Taxonomic and Geographic Reference. D. E. Wilson and D. M. Reeder eds. Johns Hopkins University Press, Baltimore.

Aeromys
Rodents of Malaysia
Rodents of Indonesia
Mammals described in 1900
Taxa named by Charles Hose
Taxonomy articles created by Polbot